Fábio André Cruz Marinheiro (born 11 November 1988) is a Portuguese footballer who plays for  Os Belenenses as a defender.

Football career
On 27 July 2013, Marinheiro made his professional debut with Atlético CP in a 2013–14 Taça da Liga match against Académico Viseu.

References

External links

Stats and profile at LPFP 

1988 births
Living people
People from Montijo, Portugal
Portuguese footballers
Association football defenders
C.D. Montijo players
União Montemor players
Casa Pia A.C. players
G.D. Fabril players
Atlético Clube de Portugal players
Liga Portugal 2 players
Sport Benfica e Castelo Branco players
S.C. Olhanense players
C.D. Mafra players
S.U. Sintrense players
GS Loures players
S.C.U. Torreense players
Clube Oriental de Lisboa players
C.F. Os Belenenses players
Sportspeople from Setúbal District